Deer Creek Valley Rural Historic District is a national historic district located in Deer Creek Township, Carroll County, Indiana. It encompasses 44 contributing buildings, 17 contributing sites, and 13 contributing structures on 20 historic properties near Delphi, Indiana.  It includes several farmsteads, four cemeteries, two bridges (High Bridge and the separately listed Wilson Bridge), the Monon railroad right of way, the Delphi-Camden Road, and Deerk Creek and its slate bluffs. Notable farmsteads include the Mears Family Farmstead with a two-story Greek Revival style brick farmhouse.

It was listed on the National Register of Historic Places in 2002.

References

Historic districts on the National Register of Historic Places in Indiana
Greek Revival architecture in Indiana
Gothic Revival architecture in Indiana
Buildings and structures in Carroll County, Indiana
National Register of Historic Places in Carroll County, Indiana